The 2004 Spanish general election was held on Sunday, 14 March 2004, to elect the 8th Cortes Generales of the Kingdom of Spain. All 350 seats in the Congress of Deputies were up for election, as well as 208 of 259 seats in the Senate.

The electoral outcome was heavily influenced by the aftermath of the Madrid train bombings on 11 March, as a result of which all parties suspended their electoral campaigns. For two days following the attacks, the People's Party (PP) government kept blaming the terrorist organization ETA for the bombings, even in spite of mounting evidence suggesting the involvement of Islamist groups. The government was accused of misinformation, as an Islamist attack would have been perceived as the direct result of Spain's involvement in the Iraq War, which had been highly unpopular among the public.

The election result was described by some media as an "unprecedented electoral upset". The perceived abuse of the PP's absolute majority throughout the legislature, with a focus on Spain's involvement in Iraq, was said to have helped fuel a wave of discontent against the incumbent ruling party, with the government's mismanagement on the bombings serving as the final catalyst for change to happen. At 11 million votes and 42.6%, the opposition Spanish Socialist Workers' Party (PSOE) increased by 3.1 million its 2000 result, securing 164 seats—a net gain of 39. In contrast, the PP, which opinion polls earlier in the year had predicted would secure a diminished but still commanding victory, lost 35 seats and 7 percentage points, resulting in the worst defeat for a sitting government in Spain up to that point since 1982. The 75.7% turnout was among the highest since the Spanish transition to democracy, with no future general election having exceeded such a figure. The number of votes cast, at 26.1 million votes, remained the highest figure in gross terms for any Spanish general election until the April 2019 election.

The day after the election, Zapatero announced his will to form a minority PSOE government, supported by other parties in a confidence and supply basis. Two minor left-wing parties, Republican Left of Catalonia (ERC) and United Left (IU), immediately announced their intention to support Zapatero's government. On 16 April 2004, Zapatero was elected as new prime minister by an outright majority of the new Congress, with 183 out of 350 members voting for him, being sworn in the next day.

Overview

Electoral system
The Spanish Cortes Generales were envisaged as an imperfect bicameral system. The Congress of Deputies had greater legislative power than the Senate, having the ability to vote confidence in or withdraw it from a prime minister and to override Senate vetoes by an absolute majority of votes. Nonetheless, the Senate possessed a few exclusive (yet limited in number) functions—such as its role in constitutional amendment—which were not subject to the Congress' override. Voting for the Cortes Generales was on the basis of universal suffrage, which comprised all nationals over 18 years of age and in full enjoyment of their political rights.

For the Congress of Deputies, 348 seats were elected using the D'Hondt method and a closed list proportional representation, with an electoral threshold of three percent of valid votes—which included blank ballots—being applied in each constituency. Seats were allocated to constituencies, corresponding to the provinces of Spain, with each being allocated an initial minimum of two seats and the remaining 248 being distributed in proportion to their populations. Ceuta and Melilla were allocated the two remaining seats, which were elected using plurality voting. The use of the D'Hondt method might result in a higher effective threshold, depending on the district magnitude.

As a result of the aforementioned allocation, each Congress multi-member constituency was entitled the following seats:

For the Senate, 208 seats were elected using an open list partial block voting system, with electors voting for individual candidates instead of parties. In constituencies electing four seats, electors could vote for up to three candidates; in those with two or three seats, for up to two candidates; and for one candidate in single-member districts. Each of the 47 peninsular provinces was allocated four seats, whereas for insular provinces, such as the Balearic and Canary Islands, districts were the islands themselves, with the larger—Majorca, Gran Canaria and Tenerife—being allocated three seats each, and the smaller—Menorca, Ibiza–Formentera, Fuerteventura, La Gomera, El Hierro, Lanzarote and La Palma—one each. Ceuta and Melilla elected two seats each. Additionally, autonomous communities could appoint at least one senator each and were entitled to one additional senator per each million inhabitants.

Election date
The term of each chamber of the Cortes Generales—the Congress and the Senate—expired four years from the date of their previous election, unless they were dissolved earlier. The election decree was required to be issued no later than the twenty-fifth day prior to the date of expiry of the Cortes in the event that the prime minister did not make use of his prerogative of early dissolution. The decree was to be published on the following day in the Official State Gazette (BOE), with election day taking place on the fifty-fourth day from publication. The previous election was held on 12 March 2000, which meant that the legislature's term would expire on 12 March 2004. The election decree was required to be published in the BOE no later than 17 February 2004, with the election taking place on the fifty-fourth day from publication, setting the latest possible election date for the Cortes Generales on Sunday, 11 April 2004.

The prime minister had the prerogative to dissolve both chambers at any given time—either jointly or separately—and call a snap election, provided that no motion of no confidence was in process, no state of emergency was in force and that dissolution did not occur before one year had elapsed since the previous one. Additionally, both chambers were to be dissolved and a new election called if an investiture process failed to elect a prime minister within a two-month period from the first ballot. Barred this exception, there was no constitutional requirement for simultaneous elections for the Congress and the Senate. Still, as of  there has been no precedent of separate elections taking place under the 1978 Constitution.

On 9 January 2004, it was announced that the general election would be held on 14 March, with the Cortes to be dissolved on 20 January. The election date was agreed with Andalusian president Manuel Chaves, to make it being held concurrently with the 2004 Andalusian regional election.

Parliamentary composition
The Cortes Generales were officially dissolved on 20 January 2004, after the publication of the dissolution decree in the Official State Gazette. The tables below show the composition of the parliamentary groups in both chambers at the time of dissolution.

Parties and candidates
The electoral law allowed for parties and federations registered in the interior ministry, coalitions and groupings of electors to present lists of candidates. Parties and federations intending to form a coalition ahead of an election were required to inform the relevant Electoral Commission within ten days of the election call, whereas groupings of electors needed to secure the signature of at least one percent of the electorate in the constituencies for which they sought election, disallowing electors from signing for more than one list of candidates.

Below is a list of the main parties and electoral alliances which contested the election:

The Socialists' Party of Catalonia (PSC), Republican Left of Catalonia (ERC) and Initiative for Catalonia Greens (ICV) agreed to continue with the Catalan Agreement of Progress alliance for the Senate with the inclusion of United and Alternative Left (EUiA). In the Balearic Islands, PSM–Nationalist Agreement (PSM–EN), United Left of the Balearic Islands (EUIB), The Greens of the Balearic Islands (EVIB) and ERC formed the Progressives for the Balearic Islands alliance. A proposal for an all-left electoral alliance for the Senate in the Valencian Community, comprising the PSOE, United Left of the Valencian Country (EUPV) and the Valencian Nationalist Bloc (BNV) was ultimately discarded.

Campaign period

Party slogans

Opinion polls

Results

Congress of Deputies

Senate

Aftermath

Notes

References

Bibliography

General
2004 in Spain
2004
March 2004 events in Europe